Aberdeen South and North Kincardine (Gaelic: Obar Dheathain a Deas agus Ceann Chàrdainn a Tuath) is a constituency of the Scottish Parliament (Holyrood) covering part of the council areas of Aberdeen City and Aberdeenshire. It elects one Member of the Scottish Parliament (MSP) by the first past the post method of election. It is one of ten constituencies in the North East Scotland electoral region, which elects seven additional members, in addition to the ten constituency MSPs, to produce a form of proportional representation for the region as a whole.

The constituency was created for 2011 Scottish Parliament election, and combines most of the former Aberdeen South seat along with part of Aberdeenshire that was formerly in Aberdeenshire West. It has been held by Audrey Nicoll of the Scottish National Party since the 2021 Scottish Parliament election.

Electoral region

The other nine constituencies of the North East Scotland region are Aberdeen Donside, Aberdeen South and North Kincardine, Aberdeenshire East, Aberdeenshire West, Angus North and Mearns, Angus South, Banffshire and Buchan Coast, Dundee City East and Dundee City West.

The region covers all of the Aberdeen City council area, the Aberdeenshire council area, the Angus council area, the Dundee City council area and part of the Moray council area.

Constituency boundaries and council area 

For the first election to the Scottish Parliament, the constituencies used were the same as those already in existence for the House of Commons (Westminster). For the 2005 the boundaries of the Westminster constituencies were subject to some alteration, and so Holyrood and Westminster constituencies diverged.

Following their First Periodic review of parliamentary constituencies to the Scottish Parliament, the Boundary Commission for Scotland created newly shaped seats for the Aberdeen City and Aberdeenshire council areas, which were first used at the 2011 Election.

Aberdeen City is divided between three Scottish Parliament constituencies: Aberdeen Central, Aberdeen Donside and Aberdeen South and North Kincardine. Central and Donside are entirely within the city area, while South and North Kincardine also takes in North Kincardine in the Aberdeenshire council area. The remainder of Aberdeenshire is represented by four further constituencies in the Scottish Parliament: Aberdeenshire East, Aberdeenshire West, Angus North and Mearns and Banffshire and Buchan Coast.

In forming the new Aberdeen South and North Kincardine, the electoral wards used are:

In full: 
Lower Deeside
Kincorth/Nigg/Cove
North Kincardine
In part: (shared with Aberdeen Central)
Hazlehead/Ashley/Queens Cross
Airyhall/Broomhill/Garthdee
Torry/Ferryhill

Member of the Scottish Parliament

Election results

2020s

2010s

References

External links

Politics of Aberdeen
Politics of Aberdeenshire
Scottish Parliament constituencies and regions from 2011
Constituencies of the Scottish Parliament
Constituencies established in 2011
2011 establishments in Scotland
Portlethen